Up All Night is an American television sitcom created by Emily Spivey that airs on NBC. The series stars Christina Applegate and Will Arnett as Regan and Chris Brinkley, a couple who struggle to balance their home lives (especially with their newborn child, Amy) and their work lives.

Series overview

Episodes

Season 1 (2011–12)

Season 2 (2012) 
On May 11, 2012, the series was renewed for a second season. The second season originally featured 13 episodes and aired Thursdays at 8:30/7:30c after 30 Rock. Luka Jones joined the cast from the beginning of season two, playing the role of Reagan's brother, Scott.

On October 29, 2012, it was announced that NBC had ordered three extra episodes, bringing the season total to 16 episodes, and that the show was going to change from a single camera format to a multi camera format.

Rating Graph

References

External links 
 
 

Lists of American sitcom episodes
Episodes